Valiyangadi may refer to:

 Valiyangadi (film) a 2010 Indian film
 Valiyangadi (Kozhikode), a market in Kozhikode Beach